is a former Japanese football player.

Career

Youth
Davidson was born and raised in Tokyo to a Japanese mother and an American father. He moved with his family to Pasadena, California in 1995, where he attended high school and played for the American Global Soccer School.

Professional
Davidson returned to Japan in 2002, and made his professional debut with Omiya Ardija in 2002. After three seasons in the J2 League, he helped the team win promotion to the J1 League in 2004. Davidson remained with Omiya Ardija until 2006, finishing his career at the club with 87 appearances and 2 goal in all competitions.

He transferred to Albirex Niigata in 2007, but never settled at the club, and spending time on loan at Vissel Kobe and Consadole Sapporo. He returned Niigata in 2009.

Davidson returned to the United States in 2010 when he signed for Carolina RailHawks of the USSF Division 2 Professional League. He helped the Railhawks in winning the NASL Conference title and earning a trip to the USSF D-2 championship series.

He spent the 2011 season with Tokushima Vortis of Japan's J2 League. He remained at the club for one season and appeared in 24 league matches helping the club to a fourth-place finish in, three points out of promotion. Davidson signed with Vancouver Whitecaps FC of Major League Soccer on January 18, 2012, reuniting with former coach Martin Rennie. He made his debut on March 10, 2012 against the Montreal Impact and played two seasons for the Whitecaps FC. Davidson signed for the Carolina RailHawks in March 2014 and was named captain for the 2014 season. He collected the team MVP award after leading the club to a fifth-place finish in the North American Soccer League.

From 2015, he played for Thai Premier League club Navy (2015) and United Soccer League club Charlotte Independence (2016–2017). He retired from his playing career at the end of the 2017 season.

Club statistics

References

External links
 
 
 

1983 births
Living people
Albirex Niigata players
Association football people from Tokyo
Charlotte Independence players
Expatriate footballers in Thailand
Expatriate soccer players in Canada
Expatriate soccer players in the United States
Hokkaido Consadole Sapporo players
Japanese expatriate footballers
Japanese expatriate sportspeople in Canada
Japanese expatriate sportspeople in the United States
Japanese expatriate sportspeople in Thailand
Japanese footballers
Japanese people of American descent
J1 League players
J2 League players
Major League Soccer players
North American Soccer League players
North Carolina FC players
Omiya Ardija players
Jun Marques Davidson
Jun Marques Davidson
Tokushima Vortis players
USL Championship players
USSF Division 2 Professional League players
Vancouver Whitecaps FC players
Vissel Kobe players
Association football midfielders